In Greek mythology, Carmanor or Karmanor (Ancient Greek: Καρμάνωρ) was the son of Dionysus and Alexirrhoe. He was said to have been killed by a boar during hunt, and the Lydian mountain Tmolus had allegedly been named "Carmanorium" after him before receiving its newer name.

Note

References 

 Lucius Mestrius Plutarchus, Morals translated from the Greek by several hands. Corrected and revised by. William W. Goodwin, PH. D. Boston. Little, Brown, and Company. Cambridge. Press Of John Wilson and son. 1874. 5. Online version at the Perseus Digital Library.

Children of Dionysus